FF6 may refer to:

Final Fantasy VI, a 1994 role-playing game originally released on the Super NES
Fast & Furious 6, a 2013 film
Firefox 6, a web browser